Youth on Board (YOB) was based in the Boston area. YOB is a youth-led, adult supported program. 
 
YOB has worked in more than 5 countries, 27 states, and over 100 schools was a project of YouthBuild USA.

Background 
YOB was founded by Karen Young after working as a national student organizer with Campus Outreach Opportunity League (COOL). In 1993 Karen met Jenny Sazama and received initial funding from the W.K. Kellogg Foundation. Jenny was brought in as YOB's associate director and later became co-director with Karen. Jenny became the director of Youth on Board when Karen moved on to do other projects in 2010.  

YOB is widely known for the contributions to Project 540, a national student engagement program for 100,000 students in more than 100 high schools across the country. With funding from several sources, including W.K. Kellogg Foundation, Boston Public Schools, and others, Youth on Board has published numerous important materials. Most notable is 15 Points to Successfully Involving Youth in Decision-Making. Other publications by YOB include Your Guide to Youth Board Involvement and the Law, and many others.

In 2014 YOB was one of eight organizations selected by the Susan Crown Exchange to be part of their research and documentation project on social emotional learning called Preparing Youth to Thrive.

Local organizing work 
 
Boston Student Advisory Council (BSAC)

The Boston Student Advisory Council (BSAC) is a group of student leader from Boston public schools who work on issues that affect young people both inside and outside of school. BSAC is made up entirely of low-income students of color who as key stakeholders are at the center of the decisions that affect them the most. Through a partnership with the Boston Public School district (BPS), YOB co-administers this citywide body of student leaders that represents most high schools in the district.

National work 
 
Consulting and Technical Assistance
 
Youth on Board provides trainings and technical assistance on various areas, including youth/adult partnership, youth leadership development, adultism, and establishing a student advisory council. 
 
Support the Youth Voice in Decision-Making Movement
 
YOB supports youth voice in decision-making on a local and national level through speaking engagements, coalitions, consultations, writing articles, participating in research studies, and writing and selling publications.  They are regularly called upon by foundations, think tanks, Federal and State DOE, media outlets, and researchers.

References

External links 

 

Non-profit organizations based in Massachusetts
Youth organizations based in Massachusetts
Youth organizations established in 1994
Youth empowerment organizations